Microdipnus is a genus of ground beetles in the family Carabidae. There are about eight described species in Microdipnus.

Species
These eight species belong to the genus Microdipnus:
 Microdipnus corradoi Giachino, 2008  (Africa)
 Microdipnus gugheensis Jeannel, 1950  (Africa)
 Microdipnus janaki Giachino, 2008  (Africa)
 Microdipnus jeanneli (Alluaud, 1917)  (Africa)
 Microdipnus kilimanus Jeannel, 1957  (Africa)
 Microdipnus latus Jeannel, 1963  (South Africa)
 Microdipnus madecassus Jeannel, 1954  (Africa)
 Microdipnus peyrierasi Basilewsky, 1973  (Africa)

References

Trechinae